A drive-in is a facility (such as a restaurant or movie theater) where one can drive in with an automobile for service. At a drive-in restaurant, for example, customers park their vehicles and are usually served by staff who walk or rollerskate out to take orders and return with food, encouraging diners to remain parked while they eat. Drive-in theaters have a large screen and a car parking area for film-goers.

It is usually distinguished from a drive-through, in which drivers line up to make an order at a microphone set up at window height, and then drive to a window where they pay and receive their food. The drivers then take their meals elsewhere to eat. Notably however, during peak periods, patrons may be required to park in a designated parking spot and wait for their food to be directly served to them by an attendant walking to their car, resulting in the perceived relationship between the two service-types. In the German-speaking world, the term is now often used instead of "drive-through" for that kind of service. In Japan, the term refers to a rest area. In France, this term has become popular because of American movies showing that kind of service, and more recently due to the expansion of fast-food restaurants.

The first drive-in restaurant was Kirby's Pig Stand, which opened in Dallas, Texas, in 1921. In North America, drive-in facilities of all types have become less popular since their heyday in the 1950s and 1960s, with drive-throughs rising to prominence since the 1970s and 1980s.

The largest Drive-In still in operation is The Varsity of Atlanta, Georgia.

In popular culture 
As a symbol of the 1950s, a drive-in is featured in many films and TV series about this period. The film American Graffiti (1973) has several scenes in or around a drive-in, while in Happy Days, "Arnold's Drive-In" is one of the main settings for much of the series.

See also 
 Drive-through
 Drive-in theater
 Drive-In Classics, a Canadian TV channel
 List of drive-in restaurants
 List of drive-in theaters
 Safari park

References

External links

 
 
 
 

Articles containing video clips
 
Road transport
Restaurants by type
1950s fads and trends